is a Japanese manga by Natsuo Imamura (the pen name of Kengo Yonekura).

Plot
Fire Candy takes place near-future fictional Earth, where unexplained things worldwide hormonal discrepancies in the human species brought a catastrophic crackdown of humanity's ability to reproduce themselves, depriving them forever of such a natural asset. Searching for a way to prevent their own extinction, humans found a way out of the crisis by means of interbreeding with animals, thus giving birth to the so-called Halfs, hybrids between human beings and beasts. This story focuses on one group of such creatures, juveniles discriminated and loathed by  humans, in their daily struggles. Ryoki and his gang acts as anti-heroes, given the fact that they often brawl, steal or maim, though always against other street delinquents. It's through their acts that they demonstrate to be  human, even  being physically half-animals.

The manga was never finished, what happened after the second volume was left unknown till this day. (there was a message at the end of the second volume hinting that the manga may resume in the future, it is only a slight possibility as the manga artist has shown no clear intent of finishing the series and may remain unfinished)

Characters

Ryoki:  A 16-year-old half-human/half-cow youth protagonist, (which technically would make him a half-bull, he being a male). Often bullied and isolated as a child due to his cow heritage, until he met Leo and formed a fast friendship with him, which endured all the way until the time the story takes place. While being depicted as a delinquent who is a bit lecherous, reckless and a drug user (the titular fire candy), he becomes a brutal savage while brawling, drawing insane pleasure by mauling whoever he has under his fists at the given time. He was deeply in love with Akito, and her death shook him tremendously, to the point of him deluding himself or succumbing to even greater brawling-induced madness. He founded the Jammy Angels gang with his friends as a way to impose themselves, easily find more drugs or commit other acts of delinquency. Just at the end of the manga, he gave in to his barbaric urges when he mauled to death and beheaded one of Lloyd's henchmen with his bare hands.

Leo: A heavily-tanned, golden-haired half lion, Leo is Ryoki's best friend.  Leo was often picked on as a child, but contrary to Ryoki he brutally fought back, and was also the first one to inspire Ryoki not to back down against abuse, but instead fight back to defend himself. This very speech started haunting him years later when Leo witnessed how brutal Ryoki became while fighting, to the point of becoming frightened of him. He himself shows off as cool and aloof, but heavily supports the fact that he himself is not a savage beast, a resolution that started to crack when he beat to death a fellow juvenile.

Akito: Part of Ryoki's group. For a brief time she is presented as the main female lead, Yukito's twin sister and also Ryoki's lover - who is often her ire's object when he gropes her bust. Hitting puberty and learning what feelings and carnal pleasure were, she and Ryoki shared a night of passionate sex, after which she succumbed to the brutal after-effects of Fire Candy, burning from the  inside-out and melting into a putrid mass of blood and flesh. Her death served as the main catalyst to fuel Ryoki's savagery and madness to an even greater extent.

Yukito: Akito's twin sister, different only due to her longer hair and the fact that she wore a number of piercing on her ears. She boasted a proud and rebellious personality, though this was just a farce to conceal her huge crush for Ryoki, which was never reciprocated. On one of their encounters, he even mistook her for her dead sister Akito. She was kidnapped and almost gang-raped by Lloyd's henchmen, but was rescued in time by Ryoki and his friends.

Haru/Haruki: Haruki is an extremely feminine-looking male prostitute and one-quarter lynx, notable due to his platinum hair that once earned him the nickname of Platinum Lynx. The oldest of Ryoki's acquaintances at 24 years old (though he looks much younger). Ten years before the beginning of the story, he was part of a fearsome gang of juveniles known as Platinum, enjoying a lifestyle of savage brawling. He was a good friend of Lloyd, Platinum's leader, though some facts (left unknown) led the two to separate ways. Sometimes after that he came to know a girl who became his lover and bore him a child, though the two were assaulted by Tetsuya and his thugs, which gang-raped both Haru and his girlfriend after forcing her to give birth, while filming the whole assault as amateur pornography. Though often used as a comic relief, Haru is even more of a monster while fighting than Ryoki, and appears to be something of a twisted sadist, getting sexually aroused by seeing Ryoki fight, or when he himself mauls others.

Miyuki: The only complete human of Ryoki's group, a four-eyed juvenile which is often left behind during brawls. As a statement to the fact that he is fully human, he still has parents.

Lloyd: The main antagonist of the story. Ten years earlier, he was the leader of the feared Platinum, and a friend of both Tetsuya and Haruki, especially the latter. However, something in the past disbanded the group and led Lloyd to become a powerful criminal lord of the underworld. He is the main distributor of the drug, Fire Candy, and is also the one who sent Tetsuya and his henchmen to brutalize Haruki and his girlfriend when they were together. In the story, he never took active part in anything that involved the main characters, but he became the main focus of their rage, beginning with the raise in Fire Candy's prices, which brought Ryoki to found Jammy Angels, to steal more of the drug.

Tetsuya/Tetsu: Tetsuya is one of Lloyd's primary henchmen. A laid-back individual, he is a sick and twisted sadist, and the one primarily responsible in raping both Haruki and his wife. A very capable fighter, he was part of Platinum before the gang was disbanded, and ended up being used by Lloyd as a thug. He was the one who kidnapped Yukito, and almost raped her before Ryoki came and fought with him. Confident of winning, Tetsuya stabbed him with a knife, only to have Ryoki assault him and slit his throat, after which he was beheaded by Ryoki's bare hands.

External links

 Author's official website

Akita Shoten manga
Manga series
Shōnen manga
Unfinished comics